Assaffal bin P. Alian is a Malaysian politician who has been the State Assistant Minister. He has served as the Member of Sabah State Legislative Assembly (MLA) for Tungku since May 2018. He is a member of the Sabah Heritage Party (WARISAN).

Election results

References

Malaysian politicians
Living people
Year of birth missing (living people)